The 2014 Rugby Championship was the third edition of the expanded annual southern hemisphere Rugby Championship consisting of Argentina, Australia, South Africa and New Zealand. The tournament was won by New Zealand, with South Africa second, Australia third, and Argentina last.

The Championship began on 16 August with Australia hosting the defending champions, New Zealand, at the Stadium Australia in Sydney and South Africa hosting Argentina at Loftus Versfeld Stadium in Pretoria. The tournament continued for seven weeks, which included two byes, and concluded on 5 October with South Africa versus New Zealand at Ellis Park Stadium in Johannesburg and Argentina versus Australia at Estadio Malvinas Argentinas in Mendoza.

On 27 September, New Zealand clinched their third consecutive Championship after a bonus-point 34–13 win against Argentina in La Plata. The 2014 Rugby Championship was the first in which New Zealand failed to win all their matchesthey drew with Australia in Week 1 and lost to South Africa in Week 6. It also saw the first Championship-match win for Argentina who defeated Australia 21–17 in the last match of the tournament.

Format and standings
The format for the 2014 tournament was the same as that for the 2012 and 2013 editions. Each side played the other once at home, and once away; giving a total of six matches each, and twelve in total. A win earns a team four points, a draw two points, and a loss no points. A bonus point can be earned one of two ways: by scoring four tries or more in a match, or by losing within seven points. The competition winner is the side with the most points at the end of the tournament, however if two sides finish equal on points the side with the most wins is placed higher.

Summary

The first match of the championship was between New Zealand (also known as the All Blacks) and Australia (the Wallabies) in Sydney, Australia. The fixture doubled as a Bledisloe Cup match, and ended as a 12–12 draw. The All Blacks started stronger, and led 9–3 at half time, but Australia were much better in the second half. New Zealand had two players temporarily sent-off after being awarded yellow cards, but Australia were unable to capitalize on that advantage during their late dominance. All points were scored from penaltiesfour from each side. The draw ended a 17-match winning streak by the All Blacks. The following week both side met in their second Bledisloe Cup match of the Championship (the third is played following the tournament), but this time at Eden Park in New Zealand. The match was comfortably won by New Zealand 51–20, whose scored six tries to Australia's two. The All Blacks were regarded as the more physical of the two teams,  and scored two tries from mauls. The win meant that New Zealand retained the Bledisloe Cup (Australia needed to win the three-match series to regain the cup).

The second match of the tournament was between South Africa (the Springboks) and Argentina (the Pumas) and played at Loftus Versfeld Stadium in Pretoria, South Africa. South Africa won 13–6 and scored the only try of the match, which was played in wet and raining conditions. The following week the two teams met again, this time at Estadio Padre Ernesto Martearena in Salta, Argentina. The Springboks won again, but were considered lucky to get the 31–33 victory. At one stage Argentina were winning by 12 points, and were leading with five minutes remaining, but Springbok Morné Steyn kicked a penalty in the 76th minute to give South Africa the lead and the win.

In weeks three and four, Argentina and South Africa both travelled to Australasia for two away matches. Argentina played the All Blacks in Napier where they lost 28–9, before facing Australia on the Gold Coast where they lost 32–25. The Pumas loss to the All Blacks was played in wet conditions, with New Zealand scoring four tries, and Argentina three penalties. Argentina's loss to Australia was much closer than their defeat in New Zealand. Despite leading by 16 points after 60 minutes, Australia conceded twelve points in the final quarter. Argentina trailed by seven points, the value of a converted try, when they had a scrum deep within Wallabies' territory, but Australia were awarded a free-kick after the Pumas' scrum-half fed the ball too early and the game ended. In the third week the Springboks played Australia in Perth, where the Wallabies won 24–23. The Wallbies had trailed 23–14, but scored ten unanswered points after Springbok wing Bryan Habana, who was playing in his 100th test match, was yellow carded for a high tackle. The following week South Africa played the All Blacks in Wellington. The match was won 14–10 by New Zealand, but only after they resisted repeated South African attacks on their try-line late in the game. The win was the 36th consecutive victory for the All Blacks in New Zealanda record stretching back to 2009.

The last two weekends of matches were played in South Africa and Argentina. First up the Wallabies faced the Springboks in Cape Town, where South Africa won 28–10. The victory came after a ten-minute period at the end of the match where the Springboks scored three-tries. The same weekend Argentina faced the All Blacks in La Plata. For the New Zealanders the match was overshadowed by the omission of Aaron Cruden, who had missed the flight to Argentina, and was subsequently dropped from the squad for the last two weeks of the Championship. The All Blacks won 34–13, and with the bonus-point win took an unassailable lead in the Championshipgiving them their third Rugby Championship, and 13th overall since the inception of the Tri-Nations Championship in 1996.

Despite New Zealand having secured the Championship title a week earlier, the final week of matches proved historic. The first match was the Springboks hosting the All Blacks at Ellis Park Stadium in Johannesburg. All Blacks' captain Richie McCaw played his 134th match for the side, surpassing the national record held by Colin Meads. However the New Zealanders 22-match unbeaten run (going back to December 2012) was ended after a  penalty kicked by South African Patrick Lambie in the 78th minute gave his side a 27–25 win. The last match of the tournament was between Argentina and Australia at Mendoza. The test was won 21–17 by the Pumastheir first win in the Rugby Championship since joining the competition in 2012. Australia led 14–0 within the first 15 minutes after scoring two early tries, however Argentina slowly accumulated points to overhaul their opponents.

Sponsorship
The 2014 Rugby Championship was also known, for sponsorship reasons, as The Castle Lager Rugby Championship in South Africa, The Investec Rugby Championship in New Zealand, The Castrol Edge Rugby Championship in Australia and The Personal Rugby Championship in Argentina.

Fixtures

Week 1

Notes:
 Conrad Smith was named in the starting XV, but was withdrawn from the team on 15 August to attend the birth of his first child.
 Joe Moody made his international debut for New Zealand.
 The draw ended New Zealand's 17-match winning streak, preventing them from taking sole charge of the record for longest winning streak by a Tier 1 nation.

Notes:
 Willem Alberts and Juan Martín Hernández were both named in their respective starting XV, but were withdrawn from their teams hours before kick off due injuries.
 Damian de Allende made his international debut for South Africa.

Week 2

Notes:
 Cory Jane earned his 50th test cap for New Zealand.
 New Zealand retain the Bledisloe Cup.

Notes:
 Marcos Ayerza earned his 50th test cap for Argentina.
 This loss was Argentina's seventh consecutive loss at home, the most consecutive losses at home.

Week 3

Notes:
 Saia Fainga'a was named on the bench, but was withdrawn from the squad to attend the birth of his child.
 Bryan Habana became the fourth South Africa player to earn 100 test caps.
 Warren Whiteley made his international debut for South Africa.

Week 4

Notes:
 Jean de Villiers became the fifth South Africa player to earn 100 test caps.
 New Zealand retained the Freedom Cup.

Notes:
 The attendance of 14,281 was the lowest attendance for an Australia home test match this century.
 Tatafu Polota-Nau earned his 50th test cap for Australia.
 Australia retained the Puma Trophy.

Week 5

Notes:
 Cobus Reinach made his international debut for South Africa.
 South Africa retain the Mandela Challenge Plate.

Notes:
 Nathan Harris made his international debut for New Zealand.

Week 6

Notes:
 This loss, was New Zealand's first loss in The Rugby Championship since its formation in 2012.
 South Africa becomes the first team to beat New Zealand, since the All Black's 38–21 loss to England in 2012.
 This was South Africa's first win over New Zealand since their 18–5 win during the 2011 Tri Nations Series.

Notes:
 This was Argentina's first ever win in The Rugby Championship since its formation in 2012.
 This was Argentina's first win over Australia since their 18–16 win in 1997.
 Jake Schatz and Joshua Mann-Rea made their international debuts for Australia.

Warm-up matches
On 25 July and 2 August, Argentina played two uncapped matches against French Top 14 side Grenoble in preparation for the tournament. This was the third year in which Argentina had played two warm-up matches pre Rugby Championship; New South Wales Waratahs Barbarians in 2013 and Stade Français in 2012.

Squads

Summary

Note: Ages, caps and domestic side are of 16 August 2014 – the starting date of the tournament.

Argentina
Argentina 30-man squad for the Championship was announced on 23 June. In addition to the 30-man squad, a further nine players were invited to train with the squad and acted as stand-by players should a call-up have been necessary. Those players are: hookers Julián Montoya (Newman) and Santiago Iglesias (Uni. Tucumán), lock Guido Petti (San Isidro), number 8 Benjamín Macome, scrum-half Felipe Ezcurra (Hindú), fly-half Patricio Fernández (Jockey Club), centres Matías Moroni (CUBA) and Javier Rojas (Uni. Tucumán) and winger Ramiro Moyano (Lince R.C.)

On 15 July, Marcos Ayerza was added to the squad to provide further options in the front row.

On 10 September, Benjamín Macome was promoted to the main squad as cover for Tomás Lavanini, who was unable to play in the fourth round.

Australia
Australia 32-man squad for the Championship was announced on 23 July.

Although Henry Speight has been named in the squad, he is not eligible to play for the Wallabies until September 11, after round three of the Championship.

On 30 July, Peter Betham was called up to the squad as cover for Henry Speight, who was ruled out with a hamstring injury.

On 5 August, Tolu Latu and Laurie Weeks were called up to the squad as cover for Tatafu Polota-Nau, who was ruled out of the opening match with a ligament injury, and Scott Sio who was ruled out with an ankle injury.

On 10 August, Tom English and Paddy Ryan were called up to the squad to cover Joe Tomane and Laurie Weeks who both suffered hamstring injuries in training, thus being ruled out of the start of the Championship.

On 11 August, Saia Fainga'a was called up to the squad to replace Tolu Latu who was withdrawn from the squad due to a broken arm.

On 27 August, Kyle Godwin was called up to the squad to replace Pat McCabe who was withdrawn from the squad due to a retirement enforced injury.

On 4 September, Josh Mann-Rea was called up to the squad as cover for Saia Fainga'a, who potentially would have to leave the squad for the birth of his child during the week leading up to Round 3. Although Mann-Rea remained in the squad for Round's 5 and 6 with Polota-Nau withdrawing from the squad due to injury.

On 7 September, Will Genia and Benn Robinson was added to the squad as training cover for their respective positions. Although they remained in the squad for Round's 5 and 6 as a full squad member.

On 8 September, Jake Schatz was added to the squad as cover for Wycliff Palu who was ruled out of Round 4.

New Zealand
New Zealand 31-man squad for the Championship was announced on 28 July.

On 6 August, Colin Slade was added to the squad as cover for Dan Carter, who will miss the opening two matches of the Championship.

Joe Moody was also named in the squad as an injury replacement for Tony Woodcock who was initially meant to miss the start of the Championship. However, on 8 August he was ruled out of the whole Championship with Moody replacing Woodcock fully in the squad. Jeremy Thrush was also added to the squad on 8 August, to cover Dominic Bird who will miss the opening two matches due to injury.

On 15 August, Ryan Crotty was added to the squad to cover Conrad Smith who returned to New Zealand pre-round 1 due to the birth of his child.

On 16 September, Nathan Harris was added to the squad for Round's 5 and 6 as cover in his position.

On 22 September, Tom Taylor was added to the squad to replace Aaron Cruden who was withdrawn from the squad as a disciplinary action.

South Africa
South Africa 30-man squad for the Championship was announced on 2 August.

On 6 August, Juan Smith was called up to the squad to cover Victor Matfield who has been ruled out of the opening match of the championship.

On 16 August, Warren Whiteley was added to the squad as cover for Willem Alberts, who was ruled out of Round 2 with a hamstring injury.

On 25 August, Marcel van der Merwe was added to the squad to replace Frans Malherbe who was withdrawn from the squad prior to Round 3 due to an injury.

On 14 September, JP Pietersen was added to the squad for the final two matches of the Championship.

On 17 September, Schalk Burger was added to the squad to replace Francois Louw who withdrew from the squad for Round's 5 and 6 due to injury.

‡ denotes players who are contracted to the South African Rugby Union.

Statistics

Points scorers

Try scorers

See also
 History of rugby union matches between Argentina and Australia
 History of rugby union matches between Argentina and New Zealand
 History of rugby union matches between Argentina and South Africa
 History of rugby union matches between Australia and South Africa
 History of rugby union matches between Australia and New Zealand
 History of rugby union matches between New Zealand and South Africa

References

2014
2014 in New Zealand rugby union
2014 in South African rugby union
2014 in Australian rugby union
2014 rugby union tournaments for national teams
2014 in Argentine rugby union